Nineveh Township is one of ten townships in Adair County, Missouri, United States. As of the 2010 census, its population was 1,289. The township is named from the town of Nineveh, a German communistic colony that was established in the area in about 1850.

Geography
It contains two cemeteries: Nineveh and Novinger.

The streams of Brush Creek, Davis Branch, Hazel Creek, Little Hazel Creek, Mulberry Creek, Rye Creek, Shuteye Creek and Spring Creek run through this township.

References

 USGS Geographic Names Information System (GNIS)

External links
 US-Counties.com
 City-Data.com

German-American culture in Missouri
Townships in Adair County, Missouri
Kirksville micropolitan area, Missouri
Townships in Missouri
1850 establishments in Missouri